Bačman or Baçman ( 1229–36) was a Kipchak leader in the Lower Volga. He belonged to the Olberlik clan. In 1229 he fought the invading Mongols. The Kipchaks revolted against Mongol rule. Möngke Khan captured Kipchak leaders Bačman and Qačir-üküle. He is mentioned in several Tatar and Nogay legends, some nomad clans claiming ancestry from him.

References

Sources

13th-century Kipchacks
Turkic rulers
13th-century Turkic people
13th-century military personnel